Buttons is a traditional character in Cinderella pantomimes, and is commonly portrayed in Cinderella pantomimes throughout the UK and Australia. He is typically a male servant of the household who helps Cinderella and loves her, and who is liked and trusted but not loved by her.  The character has sometimes been called Pedro.

The character first appeared in 1860 at the Strand Theatre, London in a version of the story derived from the opera La Cenerentola by Rossini.  Rossini includes a character Dandini as assistant to the Prince, which was also included, and a complementary character for Cinderella, called Buttoni was added for the pantomime at this time.  'Buttons' was at that time a name for a young male servant or pageboy commonly having gilt buttons down the front of his jacket.

While the character introduces a note of pathos in his unrequited love for Cinderella, he is often portrayed in a comic tone.

Buttons is the servant of Cinderella's stepfather, Baron Hardup, and is Cinderella's friend.

People who have played Buttons
Arthur Askey 26 December 1947 Radio BBC Home Service
Graham Bickley 1991 Richmond Theatre Surrey
Jack Buchanan 1941 unspecified Midlands Theatre 
Brian Conley 2009, 2015 and 2021 
Ronnie Corbett
Billy Dainty 1976 Manchester Opera House
Jim Davidson 1988 Dominion Theatre London
Lonnie Donegan 1966 Alhambra Theatre, Glasgow
Bud Flanagan 1945 Adelphi Theatre
Tommy Handley 26 December 1929 BBC Radio
Jack Hulbert 27 December 1948 BBC TV
David Jason 1979 Newcastle Theatre Royal
Danny Kaye mid-1950s in Sydney, New South Wales, Australia
Paul Keating 2007 The Old Vic
Adele King 1984 Olympia Theatre, Dublin
Harry Lauder 1907 first stage appearance
Lee Mack 2021
Tom O'Connor (comedian) 1976 Southport Theatre
Jimmy O'Dea 1923 Queen's Theatre, Dublin
Wilfred Pickles 1947 Bradford Alhambra
Ted Ray 1942 unspecified Midland Theatre
Frank Skinner 2000 TV film of stage show
Tommy Steele 1958 Rodgers and Hammerstein musical version in London. 
Jimmy Tarbuck 25 December 1969 BBC1 TV
Tommy Trinder 1948-9 London Palladium later undated
Tim Vine 2018 New Wimbledon Theatre
Wee Georgie Wood 1936 Birmingham theatre

References

Cinderella characters
Pantomime